Phanogomphus lividus, the ashy clubtail, is a species of clubtail in the dragonfly family Gomphidae.

The IUCN conservation status of Phanogomphus lividus is "LC", least concern, with no immediate threat to the species' survival. The IUCN status was assessed in 2014.

References

External links

 

Gomphidae
Insects described in 1854